Game 6 (stylized as Game6) is a 2005 American film directed by Michael Hoffman, first presented at the Sundance Film Festival, released in the United States in 2006, and starring Michael Keaton. It follows a fictional playwright, Nicky Rogan, who has a new stage play opening on the same day the sixth game of the 1986 World Series is played. It realizes a 1991 screenplay by Don DeLillo, with a soundtrack written and performed by Yo La Tengo. The supporting cast features Robert Downey Jr., Bebe Neuwirth, Griffin Dunne, and Catherine O'Hara.

Plot
Nicky Rogan has written several plays and has achieved success.  It's now opening night of his latest effort and everyone around him assure him that this one will be the best yet. But as opening hour approaches, Rogan falls prey to doubts and fears, egged on by another playwright whose last work was trashed by the local newspaper's new drama critic, Steven Schwimmer. He eventually lets those fears drive him to resolve to kill the critic (who he assumes will also trash his play) and he procures a handgun with which to perform the deed.

Instead of attending the play's opening night, Rogan spends time in a bar, accompanied by a lady cab driver and her grandson; earlier in the evening she misidentified Rogan as a local, small-time hoodlum but he doesn't correct her misidentification.

They watch the crucial Game 6 of the 1986 World Series between the Boston Red Sox and the New York Mets. The Sox have won 3 games and could clinch the title by winning Game 6 but Rogan, a lifelong Sox fan, knows how easily the team can lose when they should win. He spends the evening waiting for the inevitable, even though the Sox are leading most of the time. When the inevitable does occur (due to an unexpected pair of errors at the end of the final inning), he snaps and leaves to take out his rage on the newspaper critic.

Rogan not only finds the critic but sees him in the early stages of deflowering the playwright's daughter. He begins firing wildly and is finally calmed when he learns the critic is equally devastated by the Sox's loss.  They end up together, watching an interminable rerun of the final error by Bill Buckner on a small television set in the critic's apartment.

Cast
 Michael Keaton as Nicky Rogan
 Robert Downey Jr. as Steven Schwimmer
 Ari Graynor as Laurel Rogan
 Bebe Neuwirth as Joanna Bourne
 Griffin Dunne as Elliott Litvak
 Shalom Harlow as Paisley Porter
 Nadia Dajani as Renee Simons
 Harris Yulin as Peter Redmond
 Roger Rees as Jack Haskins
 Tom Aldredge as Michael Rogan
 Lillias White as Toyota Moseby
 Amir Ali Said as Matthew
 Catherine O'Hara as Lillian Rogan
 Rock Kohli as Ramaswamy Choudhry
 John Tormey as George, Georgie, Giorgio
 Harry Bugin as Dodgie

Production
The film was made as an independent effort, largely as a labor of love, with all the "name" players working for little more than scale (Keaton's salary was $100/day, for instance).  Filming was completed in 20 days, and the filming budget was $500,000.  Most of the filming occurred in New York City.

Reception 
, the film holds a 60% approval rating on Rotten Tomatoes, based on 43 reviews with an average rating of 5.9/10. The website's critics consensus reads: "Though packed with Don DeLillo's witty dialogue and bolstered by strong performances, particularly by lead Michael Keaton, Game 6 also suffers from uneven direction and overwrought symbolism." Leonard Maltin gave the film two and a half stars, describing it as "a writer’s film if there ever was one”.

References

External links

 Official Website via Internet Archive
 

2005 films
2000s sports comedy-drama films
American baseball films
American sports comedy-drama films
Works by Don DeLillo
Films set in the 1980s
Films directed by Michael Hoffman
2000s English-language films
2000s American films
Films about Major League Baseball